The 1980 European Figure Skating Championships was a senior-level international competition held at the Scandinavium in Gothenburg, Sweden on 22–27 January. Elite senior-level figure skaters from European ISU member nations competed for the title of European Champion in the disciplines of men's singles, ladies' singles, pair skating, and ice dancing.

Results

Men

Ladies

Pairs

Ice dancing

References

External links
 results

European Figure Skating Championships, 1980
European Figure Skating Championships, 1980
European Figure Skating Championships
International figure skating competitions hosted by Sweden
International sports competitions in Gothenburg
1980s in Gothenburg
January 1980 sports events in Europe